Two ships of the Royal Navy have borne the name HMS Tetrarch, after the Greek term meaning "ruler of a quarter":

  was an  launched in 1917 and sold in 1934.
  was a T-class submarine launched in 1939 and sunk in 1941.

Royal Navy ship names